Hiraea is a genus in the Malpighiaceae, a family of about 75 genera of flowering plants in the order Malpighiales. Hiraea comprises over 55 species of woody vines and shrubs found in diverse habitats, except very dry vegetation types, in the New World tropics and subtropics from western Mexico to Paraguay and adjacent Argentina and southeastern Brazil; it also occurs in the Lesser Antilles in Grenada and St. Lucia.

Hiraea faginea and H. fagifolia are among the most widespread species. Hiraea perplexa W. R. Anderson of Ecuador is included in the IUCN Red List of Threatened Species.

External links
Herbarium.lsa.umich.edu: Hiraea
Herbarium.lsa.umich.edu: Malpighiaceae - description, taxonomy, phylogeny, and nomenclature

Malpighiaceae
Malpighiaceae genera
Neotropical realm flora
Taxa named by Nikolaus Joseph von Jacquin
Taxonomy articles created by Polbot